Trevor Cosmo Bryan Jr (born August 23, 1989) is an American professional boxer and former WBA (Regular) heavyweight Champion.

Early life 
Trevor Bryan was born on August 23, 1989 in Albany, New York.

He began boxing at the age of 11, and had a very promising but short amateur career. He is trained by Stacey McKinley, a former trainer of Mike Tyson and promoted by boxing promoter Don King.

Professional career

Bryan made his professional debut in May 2011 defeating Demarcus Young by RTD in the second round in Hollywood, Florida. In August 2015, Bryan beat Derric Rossy in Las Vegas, Nevada and won the WBC-NABF Junior heavyweight title. Even though Bryan scored a first-round knockdown, Rossy proved to be a tricky opponent and the fight ended being very competitive and exciting until the last bell.

Bryan would go on to beat former cruiserweight title challenger BJ Flores to win the WBA interim heavyweight title.

Bryan was due to fight Mahmoud Charr on January 29, 2021 for his WBA (Regular) heavyweight title; however, Charr could not travel to fight as he did not have a valid United States visa. Due to this, Bryan instead fought former WBC champion Bermane Stiverne for the vacant title, which had been stripped from Charr due to being inactive for too long. Bryan knocked his opponent down twice and won the bout by eleventh-round technical knockout, becoming the WBA (Regular) champion.

Bryan lost his title when he was defeated by Daniel Dubois by knockout in the fourth round in front of approximately 500 spectators at Casino Miami in Florida on 11 June 2022 on a card promoted by Don King.

Professional boxing record

References

External links

Trevor Bryan - Profile, News Archive & Current Rankings at Box.Live

1989 births
Living people
American male boxers
African-American boxers
African-American Muslims
American people of Jamaican descent
Sportspeople from Albany, New York
Boxers from New York (state)
Heavyweight boxers
World heavyweight boxing champions
World Boxing Association champions
21st-century African-American sportspeople
20th-century African-American people